The All-Ireland Senior B Hurling Championship 2004 was the 26th staging of the All-Ireland Senior B Hurling Championship, Ireland's secondary hurling knock-out competition.  Kildare won the championship, beating Mayo 3-14 to 3-7 in the final at Croke Park, Dublin.

Results

All-Ireland Senior B Hurling Championship

References

 Donegan, Des, The Complete Handbook of Gaelic Games (DBA Publications Limited, 2005).

2004
B